Ken McCormack (born 18 January 1933) is  a former Australian rules footballer who played with South Melbourne in the Victorian Football League (VFL).

Notes

External links 		
		
		
		
		
		
		
Living people		
1933 births		
		
Australian rules footballers from Victoria (Australia)		
Sydney Swans players